Mladé víno (Young Wine) is a 1986 Czechoslovak comedy film directed by Václav Vorlíček. The film is the third part of a trilogy, which includes Wine Working (1976) and Rough Wine (1981). It has received various awards in the Czechoslovakia (best actress, best director).

External links

References 

1986 comedy films
1986 films
Czechoslovak comedy films
Films directed by Václav Vorlíček
Czech comedy films
1980s Czech films